The RSPB Medal is awarded annually by the Royal Society for the Protection of Birds.

According to the RSPB:

The RSPB Medal is the Society's most prestigious award. It is presented to an individual in recognition of wild bird protection and countryside conservation. It is usually awarded annually to one or occasionally two people.

The medal was first awarded in 1908.

Recipients

 Rt Hon John Gummer
 Prof Chris Perrins FRS (1992)
 Bill Oddie (1997)
 Chris Mead (1999)
 Sir David Attenborough (2000)
 Robert Gillmor (2003)
 Professor Chris Baines (2004)
 Dr Colin Bibby (2004)
 Michael McCarthy (2007)
 Dr Jeff Watson (2007)
 Charles, Prince of Wales (2011)
 Prof John Lawton FRS (2011)
 Tristan da Cunha community (2012)
 Peter Harrison (2012)
 Prof Robert Watson (2013)
 The BTO, Birdwatch Ireland and SOC team who produced the Bird Atlas (2014)
 Stanley Johnson (2015)
 Prof Georgina Mace FRS (2016)
 Dick Potts (2017)
Caroline Lucas (2018)
Dara McAnulty (youngest ever recipient 2019)

See also

 List of environmental awards

References

British awards
Conservation biology
Environmental awards
Royal Society for the Protection of Birds